Abby McEnany is a writer, comedian, and actress known for the television series Work in Progress.

Early life
McEnany mostly grew up between the cities of Boston, Providence, and Columbus. McEnany's father was a cardiovascular surgeon, which caused her family to move to San Francisco for his job in 1982. She lived there for four years while she was in high school. McEnany moved to Chicago for college in 1986,  where she attended the University of Chicago, graduating in 1992.

Career
McEnany enrolled at Second City in Chicago in the 1990s, where she had Stephen Colbert as a teacher.

McEnany worked for Morningstar, Inc. in Chicago for 10 years, first in customer service and then as a technical writer.  She eventually joined Second City's touring company when she was 40, and led the ensemble "Judo Intellectuals" at the Chicago's Playground Theater.

Personal life
McEnany used to identify as a lesbian, but now refers to herself as a "queer dyke." She lives with OCD and depression.

McEnany's mother was diagnosed with Stage IV lung cancer in 2002 and died on Labor Day in 2005.

McEnany grew up in the Episcopal Church, but doesn't consider herself religious.

Filmography

Television

References

External links
 

1968 births
Living people
21st-century American actresses
21st-century American writers
21st-century American women writers
21st-century American comedians
American television actresses
American women comedians
American lesbian actresses
American lesbian writers
Lesbian comedians
American LGBT rights activists
LGBT people from Massachusetts
LGBT people from Rhode Island
LGBT people from Ohio
People with obsessive–compulsive disorder
University of Chicago alumni
Queer actresses
21st-century American LGBT people
American LGBT comedians